Rodolfo Padilla Sunseri is a Honduran politician in the Liberal Party of Honduras. He was mayor of San Pedro Sula from January 25, 2006, until June 28, 2009. He is currently in exile in Nicaragua due to the 2009 Honduran constitutional crisis. He is a supporter of the deposed President of Honduras Manuel Zelaya.

References

Living people
1960 births
Mayors of places in Honduras
20th-century Honduran lawyers
Liberal Party of Honduras politicians
Liberty and Refoundation politicians